Darwin is a ward of the London Borough of Bromley, named after Charles Darwin, who lived and worked in the ward for 40 years.

Geography
It is the largest ward in Greater London, covering a very rural area including Downe, Cudham, Leaves Green, Luxted, Single Street, Berry's Green, and Westerham Hill.

Politics

From 2010 to 2019 the local Member of Parliament was Jo Johnson, a Conservative, and brother of the Prime Minister, Boris Johnson. Jo served as Minister for Transport and Minister for London up until his resignation in November 2018. He resigned in order to support a People's Vote on the final Brexit deal. In July 2019, he was subsequently reinstated in his ministerial role as Minister for Universities before resigning in September 2019, and announced that he would stand down as an MP at the next United Kingdom general election.

Since 2019, the seat has been held by Gareth Bacon of the Conservative Party.

One councillor is elected every four years to Bromley Council. To date, the ward has only been represented by the Conservative Party.

References

External links
MapIt - Darwin ward boundary

Wards of the London Borough of Bromley